Erika Schmutz (born 1973) is a Canadian former Wheelchair rugby player and power engineer. She won a bronze medal with Team Canada in the 2008 Summer Paralympics, becoming the first woman to score a try in a Paralympic wheelchair rugby match.

Early life
Schmutz was born and raised in Windsor, Ontario, and attended Kennedy Collegiate and St. Clair College, where she competed in OFSAA track and cross-country.

Career
After injuring her arms and spine in a car accident in 2000, Schmutz joined the Canadian national wheelchair rugby team, becoming the third female athlete to ever be selected. Before her accident, Schmutz worked as a power engineer at Ontario Hydro. After qualifying for the 2008 Summer Paralympics, Schmutz became the first woman to score during a Paralympic wheelchair rugby competition as Canada went on to win a bronze medal. She was also the only woman playing wheelchair rugby professionally at a national level worldwide.

In 2010, Schmutz was named a top female athlete with a disability at the Ontario Sports Awards.

She was later named an alternate for the 2012 Summer Paralympics, if another player became too injured to play. Two years later, Schmutz was elected to the Board of Directors for the ON Para Network as the Wheelchair Rugby Representative, and was eventually named to Wheelchair Rugby Canada's Board of Directors.

References

External links
Paralympic profile

1973 births
Living people
Canadian wheelchair rugby players
Medalists at the 2008 Summer Paralympics
Paralympic bronze medalists for Canada
Paralympic medalists in wheelchair rugby
Paralympic wheelchair rugby players of Canada
Sportspeople from Windsor, Ontario
Wheelchair rugby players at the 2008 Summer Paralympics